The Douro International Natural Park is a natural park in northeast Portugal. With , it is one the largest protected areas in the country. It is located in the municipalities of Miranda do Douro, Mogadouro, Freixo de Espada à Cinta and Figueira de Castelo Rodrigo, spanning a lengthy area along the Douro River where it functions as the border between Portugal and Spain (hence "International Douro"). The park also goes includes the border area of the Águeda River. The park was created to protect the scenic landscape of the region, as well as its flora and fauna.

See also
 Arribes del Duero Natural Park

References

Nature parks in Portugal
Centro Region, Portugal
Nature conservation in Portugal
Figueira de Castelo Rodrigo
Miranda do Corvo
Norte Region, Portugal
Protected areas of Portugal
Transboundary protected areas
Natura 2000 in Portugal